The Newcastle Wildcats are a university ice hockey team representing Newcastle University in the United Kingdom. NUIHC are a member club of the British Universities Ice Hockey Association (BUIHA) and ice three teams across all three tiers of UK university competition.

The club is notable for now being the 3rd oldest amongst modern British university ice hockey programmes (having been founded in 1994) and for the fact that it was the first to introduce mixed gender participation into a full-contact university sport.

The Wildcats operate a successful beginners' training programme to develop new players. Partially as a result of this, Newcastle University was the most represented institution in terms of player registration within the BUIHA for three seasons with the Wildcats preferring to ice teams consisting almost totally of Newcastle students and mostly shunning the popular practice of pooling players from the maximum possible number of institutions. Since their inception, the Wildcats have mainly been based at Whitley Bay Ice Rink, alongside the semi-professional Whitley Warriors, rivals Northumbria Flames and, at one time, the Newcastle Vipers of the Elite Ice Hockey League. Both Newcastle University and Northumbria Clubs often played at the Metro Radio Arena during hockey evenings hosted by the Vipers, indeed the Vipers included the game between the two University teams as part of their 'farewell evening' when they left the city centre rink.

History

The Wildcats have a storied history, claiming the first two university National Championships in 2001 and 2002. They have been less successful, however, in the BUIHA era of British university hockey. After winning the Division Two (North) title in 2004, a long trophy drought was ended by a rampant first team, who won the Division One (North) title for the 2009/10 season and advanced to the national playoff finals. In 2013 the Club's C-Team won the BUIHA Tier IV Nationals - a remarkable achievement as the squad had struggled throughout the year in the Cup competition.

The Newcastle Wildcats were officially formed in 1994 by Ian Pitcher, having existed as a loose collection of Newcastle University students in previous years. One of the original coaches & players for the team was ex NHL Pittsburgh Penguins and Whitley Warriors stalwart Mike Rowe - who was studying for a postgraduate degree at the time. The newly created Wildcats would play out of Whitley Bay Ice Rink, situated on the coast just outside the city centre and represented the city of Newcastle upon Tyne as a whole by pooling players from both Newcastle University and the newly incorporated Northumbria University. This collaboration was the reason for the choice of the neutral Wildcats name, as opposed to Royals, which is the traditional nickname used by Newcastle University's sports teams. Throughout their early existence, the club iced only one team almost exclusively in challenge games against recreational ice hockey sides in the North East, rather than other higher education institutions.

This partnership lasted until 2001, when Northumbria University students formed a new side to call their own, the Flames. This was the same year of the first National Championships contested by British university sides, which was won by the Wildcats in their final appearance as a dual-university club. The success of this inaugural university tournament led to its repeat the following year, and it was again claimed by now single-institution Wildcats. With the National Championships a huge success and a growing number of institutions expressing interest in entering teams into competition, the Wildcats became a founding member of the British Universities Ice Hockey Association (BUIHA) upon its formation the following year in 2003.

With the creation of the BUIHA and, with it, properly organised divisions and regular competition against other universities (not least local rivals Northumbria Flames) the level of interest swelled and the Wildcats launched a new team, under the guidance of Andrew Miller, and whilst not held in the same regard as the club founder, Uncle Ian, Andrew Miller's name is known by all club members and is etched into history.  Especially when he founded the 'B' team, in 2004 to ice in the new third tier of university competition. The first team exceeded expectations this academic year of competition, claiming the top spot in Division Two's northern section to take the number of trophies lifted by the Wildcats to three in four years.

Two years later, another groundswell of interest in university ice hockey - particularly from students with little previous experience - led the club to set up a beginners' training programme and enter a development team, named the 'C' team, into the new third tier of BUIHA competition. With the aim of training and developing new players, the club continues to produce players who are able to compete at intermediate level competition with the 'B' team as little as twelve months after beginning to skate.

Stan Calvert Cup

Ice Hockey is one of the sports involved in the Annual Stan Calvert Cup Competition between Newcastle and Northumbria Universities. The games used to be played at the Metro Radio Arena (in the days when it had an ice pad) in front of crowds numbering in the hundreds (and occasionally, the thousands) and often in the same programme as the Newcastle Vipers professional ice hockey team.

Ball/Dek/Floor Hockey
For many years the Club ran a 'Stick Training' session in the University Sports Centre. The aim of the session was to enhance the stick handling and fitness skills of players without the expense of valuable ice time. In the 2011-12 season Joy Craighead developed these sessions further and created the Club's Dek Squad. Dek, or 'Street & Ball Hockey', uses much of the same equipment as ice hockey but is played in a normal sports centre gym, rather than an ice rink, so players run rather than skate.

External Ball Hockey Competitions

In February 2012 members of the Squad competed in the Fantastic Fours Dek Tournament in Gateshead Leisure Centre earning themselves a fleeting appearance on BSkyB.

For the 2012-2013 season the Squad finished fourth in the UKBH Northern Conference  and once again competed in the NEDekStars 'Fantastic Fours' Competition against 15 other teams

In May 2013 the squad competed in the Ball Hockey UK National Championships and finished in second place to the South Notts Outlaws in the Tier III Final.

Internal  Ball Hockey Competitions

Each year the Club holds a mini 3v3 tournament and competes for the 'Craighead Cup' (named after the tournament's founder, Joy Craighead). This is a chance for all members to have a bit of fun before the Annual Dinner and there are other awards including the 'Best-Dressed' for the team with the most outstanding uniform and the 'Wooden Spoons' for the 'best losers'.

Notable former players

Retired jerseys

Other notable players

References

External links
Newcastle Wildcats
Newcastle Wildcats at Eurohockey.com

Ice hockey teams in England
Sport in Newcastle upon Tyne
Wildcats
University ice hockey teams in England